This is a comprehensive list of the rosters of Norwegian UCI Continental cycling team, Team Joker, organised by season.

2020
, age as of 1 January 2020:

2019
Age as of 1 January 2019:

2018
Age as of 1 January 2018:

2017
Age as of 1 January 2017:

2016 
Roster in 2016, age as of 1 January 2016:

2015 
Roster in 2015, age as of 1 January 2015:

2014 
Roster in 2014, age as of 1 January 2014:

2013 
Roster in 2013, age as of 1 January 2013:

2012

2011

2010 
Roster in 2010, age as of 1 January 2010:

2009 
Roster in 2009, age as of 1 January 2009:

2008 
Roster in 2008, age as of 1 January 2008:

2007 
Roster in 2007, age as of 1 January 2007:

2006 
Roster in 2006, age as of 1 January 2006:

2005 
Roster in 2005, age as of 1 January 2005:

References

Lists of cyclists by team